Isaiah Leonja Ross (born October 24, 1996) is an American professional basketball player who last played for the Wisconsin Herd of the NBA G League. He played college basketball for the UMKC Kangaroos and the Iona Gaels.

High school career
Ross attended Davenport West High School. As a senior, he averaged 17 points per game. Ross did a postgraduate season at Hillcrest Prep, playing alongside Deandre Ayton and Marvin Bagley. He committed to playing college basketball for UMKC.

College career
As a freshman at UMKC, Ross averaged 8 points and 1.9 rebounds per game. He averaged 11.3 points and 3.1 rebounds per game as a sophomore. Following the season, he transferred to Iona, sitting out a season per NCAA regulations. As a junior, Ross averaged 11 points, 3.2 rebounds, and 1.1 assists per game. In the offseason, he worked on his defense and passing, improving his foot speed and lateral speed alongside Chasson Randle, and embraced new coach Rick Pitino's skills workouts. In the season opener against Seton Hall, Ross scored 23 points but "played very poorly," according to Pitino. On December 5, 2020, he scored a career-high 33 points in a 82–74 win over Hofstra. During his senior year, Ross helped Iona win the MAAC championship and reach the NCAA Tournament. He averaged 18.4 points, 3.9 rebounds,  1.4 assists and 1.4 steals per game. Ross was a unanimous First Team All-MAAC selection.

Professional career
Ross was selected with the 18th pick in the 2021 NBA G League draft by the Maine Celtics. He was acquired by the Santa Cruz Warriors in a three-team trade. However, he was waived on December 8, after making 7 appearances. On December 19, he signed with the Lakeland Magic. On December 30, 2021, Ross was acquired by the Oklahoma City Blue of the NBA G League, but was later waived on January 5, 2022.

Wisconsin Herd (2022)
On January 7, 2022, Ross was acquired by the Wisconsin Herd. He was then later waived on January 19, 2022.

Career statistics

College

|-
| style="text-align:left;"| 2016–17
| style="text-align:left;"| UMKC
| 34 || 10 || 17.2 || .394 || .376 || .833 || 1.9 || .6 || .5 || .0 || 8.0
|-
| style="text-align:left;"| 2017–18
| style="text-align:left;"| UMKC
| 32 || 17 || 25.2 || .400 || .359 || .779 || 3.1 || 1.0 || .5 || .0 || 11.3
|-
| style="text-align:left;"| 2018–19
| style="text-align:left;"| Iona
| style="text-align:center;" colspan="11"|  Redshirt
|-
| style="text-align:left;"| 2019–20
| style="text-align:left;"| Iona
| 29 || 21 || 31.0 || .459 || .401 || .725 || 3.2 || 1.1 || .7 || .1 || 11.0
|-
| style="text-align:left;"| 2020–21
| style="text-align:left;"| Iona
| 18 || 18 || 34.5 || .455 || .383 || .812 || 3.9 || 1.4 || 1.4 || .1 || 18.4
|- class="sortbottom"
| style="text-align:center;" colspan="2"| Career
| 113 || 66 || 25.7 || .426 || .379 || .787 || 2.9 || 1.0 || .7 || .0 || 11.4

Personal life
Ross graduated from Iona with a degree in communications with an emphasis in public relations.

References

External links
Iona Gaels bio
UMKC Kangaroos bio

1996 births
Living people
American men's basketball players
Basketball players from Iowa
Kansas City Roos men's basketball players
Iona Gaels men's basketball players
Lakeland Magic players
Sportspeople from Davenport, Iowa
Santa Cruz Warriors players
Shooting guards